Ali Khemiri is a Tunisian actor.

Filmography

Cinema 
 2000 : The Season of Men by Moufida Tlatli
 2006 : Bin El Widyene by Khaled Barsaoui
 2008 : L'Accident by Rachid Ferchiou
 2010 : Fin décembre by Moez Kamoun
 2015 : Conflit by Moncef Barbouch

Television

Series 
 1992 : El Douar
 1994 : Amwaj
 1996 : El Khottab Al Bab 
 1999 : Anbar Ellil : Mustapha
 2000 : Mnamet Aroussia
 2001 : Dhafayer : Chikh Trab
 2002 : Itr Al Ghadhab : Moncef Neji
 2003 : Ikhwa wa Zaman : Ali
 2005 : Halloula w Sallouma 
 2006 :
 Hayet Wa Amani
 Hkeyet El Aroui
 2007 : Layali el bidh : 
 2008 : Choufli Hal : Omrane
 2009 : Achek Assarab : Noureddine Lasmer
 2009–2011 : Njoum Ellil
 2010 : Min Ayyem Maliha
 2011 : Maître Malek by Fraj Slama : Hassan Ben Moumen
 2012 : Onkoud El Ghadhab
 2013 :
 Layem
 Awled Lebled (pilot épisode) 
 2015 :
 Plus belle la vie (season 11 : Prime : debt of honor) by Didier Albert : Kader
 Histoires tunisiennes
 2016 :
 Madrasat Arasoul
 Awled Moufida 
 Flashback
 Dima Ashab by Abdelkader Jerbi : Hmaîda
 2017 : Dawama 
 2018 : Lavage
 2019 : Ali Chouerreb (season 2)

Theater 
 2004 : Portraits (Choukhouss), text by Abdelbaki Mehri and director by Ali Khemiri
 2012 : Carthage en folie (Al Jamâa) by Hédi Oueld Baballah, text by Béchir Chaâbouni and Hédi Ben Amor

References

External links

Tunisian male film actors
People from Tunis
Living people
21st-century Tunisian male actors
Year of birth missing (living people)